Alain Guy (11 August 1918 – 7 November 1998) was a French philologist and hispanist.

1918 births
1998 deaths
French philologists
French male non-fiction writers
20th-century French philosophers
20th-century French male writers
20th-century philologists